John Coughlin (born 11 April 1963 in New York City) is a football player and manager.

He played for Meadowbank Thistle and Berwick Rangers until injury forced him out of the game. He is a SJFA capped player from his time at Newtongrange Star.

Following his playing career, Coughlin began a career in management with St Mirren.

Playing career 
Coughlin started out his playing career in junior football where he is a SJFA capped player from his time at Newtongrange Star.

He signed for the club Meadowbank Thistle in 1991 where he played until 1993, before moving to Berwick Rangers until injury forced him out of the game. Coughlin was assistant manager to Tom Hendrie at Berwick Rangers, helping the club win promotion in 1994. He left Berwick Rangers in 1996 and joined Alloa Athletic along with Hendrie where they also lead Alloa to promotion in 1998.

Managerial career

St Mirren
In 1998 Coughlin joined St Mirren and helped lead them to the championship in 2000. He was appointed St Mirren manager in December 2002, but results faltered and he stood down the following November.

Drexel Dragons men's soccer
In 2003, following his dismissal from St Mirren, Coughlin moved to the United States to take up a coaching position with the men's soccer team at Drexel University in Philadelphia. Under his management, the Dragons finished a disappointing 8th out of 12 teams in the regular season. Despite this, attendances were high relative to the norm in the region's second tier, the CAA Men's Soccer Tournament, with some at the university attributing this to his self-proclaimed "Heavy Entertainment" style of football. Coughlin has used this frequently since: it involves a high-tempo, direct style of play with tall, strong players deployed, all of whom are well-organised into a rigid and balanced shape. The team became renowned for converting a high amount of its goal shots from set plays.

Coughlin resigned from his coaching role with Drexel once the regular season ended, and returned to Scotland in 2004.

Berwick Rangers
Coughlin became Berwick Rangers manager in May 2005. He won the Manager of the Month prize for August 2005 and September 2005. Another great run, which set a new club record of eight league wins in a row. The months of December 2006 and January 2007 saw John awarded the Manager of the Month award again, and moved Berwick to the top of the Scottish Third Division. Berwick won the 2006–07 Scottish Third Division championship, their first title since 1979. It was Coughlin's third league title but the first in his own right. However, following a poor start to the 2007–08 season, Coughlin resigned as manager.

Stenhousemuir
In 2007, Coughlin then became manager of Stenhousemuir. He guided the club to promotion into the Second Division via the Second Division play-offs, beating Queen's Park in the 2-legged semi-final and then Cowdenbeath in the 2-legged final in May 2009. Coughlin resigned in December 2010 after a 6–0 defeat against East Fife.

East Stirlingshire
East Stirlingshire appointed Coughlin as head coach on 30 May 2011. His first two seasons in charge saw the struggling club finish bottom of the Scottish Football League. The team improved during the 2013–14 season, but Coughlin declined the offer of a new contract.

Return to Berwick Rangers
After Colin Cameron was sacked in October 2015, Coughlin returned to Berwick Rangers, beginning his second spell in charge of the side in November 2015. He left Berwick in August 2017, after a 5–1 defeat against Annan Athletic.

Selkirk F.C.
Coughlin was appointed manager of Scottish Lowland League side Selkirk, on 14 February 2018 following the departure of Ian Fergus. Coughlin cited the opportunity to work with his nephew, a player at the club, as a key reason for joining. However, he would resign after only four games in charge.

Managerial statistics 

 Berwick Rangers are based in England but play in the Scottish Professional Football League.
 Above note relates to Coughlin's first spell at Berwick Rangers.

Managerial honours
Berwick Rangers
 Scottish Third Division: 2006–07

Stenhousemuir
 Scottish Second Division play-off winners: 2008–09

References

External links 

1963 births
Association football fullbacks
Berwick Rangers F.C. managers
Berwick Rangers F.C. players
East Stirlingshire F.C. managers
Living people
Livingston F.C. players
Scottish Football League managers
Scottish Football League players
Scottish football managers
Scottish footballers
Scottish Junior Football Association players
Scottish Professional Football League managers
Soccer players from New York City
St Mirren F.C. managers
Stenhousemuir F.C. managers
Selkirk F.C. managers